NBA Inside Drive is a series of video games based on National Basketball Association, published by Microsoft Studios. Its main competition was NBA Live, a series from Electronic Arts.

Games

NBA Inside Drive 2000

The first game in the series, NBA Inside Drive 2000, was released for Microsoft Windows on August 26, 1999.

Reception

NBA Inside Drive 2000 received "favorable" reviews according to the review aggregation website GameRankings.

NBA Inside Drive 2002

After an almost two-and-a-half-year hiatus, NBA Inside Drive was brought back as NBA Inside Drive 2002 and was released in 2002 for Xbox. The game's development time was 18 months.

Reception

NBA Inside Drive 2002 received "generally favorable reviews" according to the review aggregation website Metacritic.

NBA Inside Drive 2003

Less than one year after the 2002 installment, NBA Inside Drive 2003 was released for Xbox.

Reception

NBA Inside Drive 2003 received "average" reviews according to Metacritic.

NBA Inside Drive 2004

The last entry in the series, NBA Inside Drive 2004, was released in 2003. It launched with other XSN Sports titles that featured a website where players could organize their own tournaments, seasons, or games.

Reception

Inside Drive 2004 received "average" reviews according to Metacritic. In Japan, where the game was ported for release on January 22, 2004, Famitsu gave it a score of two sevens, one six, and one seven for a total of 27 out of 40.

Discontinuation
Following Microsoft's release of their 2004 professional sports titles, all of them were discontinued including NFL Fever and NHL Rivals. In February 2005, Microsoft sold NBA Inside Drive and its other sports franchises to Ubisoft.

See also
 NBA ShootOut
 NFL Fever
 NHL Rivals

References

External links
 
 
 
 

Xbox games
Windows games
National Basketball Association video games
Microsoft franchises
Microsoft games
Basketball video games
Video game franchises
Video game franchises introduced in 1999
Xbox-only games
Windows-only games